Jacob Korley Okine (1926 - 2018) was a Ghanaian schoolmaster. He served as headmaster of Accra Academy from 1967 to 1986. He was the third head of the school.

Early life
Jacob Korley Okine was born on 5 August 1926 in Accra. His parents were James Tawiah Okai and Dede Wusu. His education began at Accra United School and was continued at Accra Academy from 1939 to 1945. He was the headboy in his final year. He studied at the intermediate department of Achimota College from 1946 to 1948. His mates at the department included Alex Kwapong, P. K. K. Quaidoo, Daniel Francis Annan, Patrick Anin and Alex Quaison-Sackey. In 1950, he was admitted to the University College of the Gold Coast and received a B. A. in Mathematics in 1952.

Career
Okine was a non-graduate tutor at Accra Academy from 1948 to 1950 when he took leave for further studies. In 1952, he returned to Accra Academy as a graduate tutor. He taught mathematics, English and Latin. In 1960, he was appointed senior mathematics master and school librarian with responsibility for the school's timetable. In May 1962, he was appointed as assistant headmaster to A. K. Konuah to replace J. A. Halm-Addo. With this, he assumed the duties of secretary of the Board of Governors.
 
In October 1967, Okine was appointed headmaster of Accra Academy. In 1973, Okine became a mathematics moderator for the West African Examinations Council (WAEC) after serving as a chief examiner for ten years for the examination body. In that same year, he became chairperson of the Greater Accra Regional branch of the Conference of Heads of Assisted Secondary Schools, a position he held for five years. From 1977 to 1979, he served on the National Advisory Council on Curriculum Development. Okine was a member of the Ghana National Committee of WAEC from 1978 to 1981. In 1980 he became a member of WAEC and served on the council until 1986. 
 
In 1986 Okine retired from the Ghana Education Service and left office as headmaster of Accra Academy. He was appointed as a member of the Accra City Council in 1987 and served as a presiding member of the city council for two four-year terms from 1987 to 1994. He was the representative of the Accra City Council on the Consultative Assembly that drafted the 1992 Constitution of Ghana.
 
On 31 January 2015, he was honoured by the Accra Metropolitan Assembly with a citation during a ball for being the longest serving presiding member of the assembly.

References

Heads of schools in Ghana
Alumni of the Accra Academy
Ga-Adangbe people
People from Accra
1926 births
2018 deaths